Bellator 290: Bader vs. Fedor 2 was a mixed martial arts event produced by Bellator MMA that took place on February 4, 2023, at the Kia Forum in Inglewood, California, United States. The card aired live on CBS and Paramount Plus, the first time the promotion has aired live on the network and the first time MMA has been broadcast live on CBS since 2010.

Background 
The main event of the Bellator 290 featured MMA legend and former PRIDE Heavyweight Champion Fedor Emelianenko's last fight before his retirement. Emelianenko will challenge Bellator Heavyweight champion Ryan Bader (also former Bellator Light Heavyweight Champion and The Ultimate Fighter: Team Nogueira vs. Team Mir light heavyweight winner) for the title. The fight, which will be the first event of 2023 for the promotion, is a rematch of their January 2019 encounter in which Bader defeated his opponent by TKO in the first round to win the Bellator Heavyweight World Championship.

The event was shown live on CBS and Paramount Plus, marking the first time the promotion has done so and the first time MMA has been broadcast live on the network since 2010.

A Bellator Light Heavyweight World Championship bout between current champion Vadim Nemkov (also the Bellator Light Heavyweight World Grand Prix Champion) and former UFC Middleweight title contender Yoel Romero was expected to take place at the event. However, Nemkov withdrew for undisclosed reasons and the bout was cancelled.

A Bellator Middleweight World Championship bout between current champion Johnny Eblen and Anatoly Tokov served as the new co-main event.

Neiman Gracie and Michael Lombardo were scheduled to face each other at this event. However, two weeks before the event, Lombardo was forced to withdraw from the bout and he was replaced by Dante Schiro.

At the weigh-ins, Diana Avsaragova missed weight for her bout, coming in at 128.8 pounds, 2.8 pounds over the flyweight non-title fight limit. The bout proceeded at catchweight and Avsaragova was fined 25% of her purse which went to Alejandra Lara.

Results

Reported payout
The following is the reported payout to the fighters as reported to the California State Athletic Commission. It is important to note the amounts do not include sponsor money, discretionary bonuses, viewership points or additional earnings.
 Ryan Bader: $150,000 (no win bonus) def. Fedor Emelianenko: $100,000
 Johnny Eblen: $150,000 (no win bonus) def. Anatoly Tokov: $75,000
 Brennan Ward: $75,000 (no win bonus) def. Sabah Homasi: $100,000
 Lorenz Larkin: $75,000 (no win bonus) def. Mukhamed Berkhamov: $33,000
 Henry Corrales: $75,000 (no win bonus) def. Akhmed Magomedov: $28,000
 Steve Mowry: $70,000 draw Ali Isaev: $70,000
 Chris Gonzalez: $100,000 (includes $50,000 win bonus) def. Max Rohskopf: $30,000
 Grant Neal: $66,000 (includes $33,000 win bonus) def. Karl Albrektsson: $35,000
 Diana Avsaragova: $32,000 (includes $16,000 win bonus) def. Alejandra Lara: $60,000
 Nikita Mikhailov: $32,000 (includes $16,000 win bonus) def. Darrion Caldwell: $50,000
 Neiman Gracie: $75,000 (no win bonus) def. Dante Schiro: $20,000
 Jaylon Bates: $20,000 (no win bonus) def. Jornel Lugo: $35,000
 Isaiah Hokit: $14,000 (includes $7,000 win bonus) def. Peter Ishiguro: $3,000
 Yusuf Karakaya: $6,000 (includes $3,000 win bonus) def. Ethan Hughes: $5,000

Viewership
After the event, it was announced that the event averaged 1.068 million viewers on CBS.

See also 

 2023 in Bellator MMA
 List of Bellator MMA events
 List of current Bellator fighters
 Bellator MMA Rankings

References 

Events in Inglewood, California
Bellator MMA events
2023 in mixed martial arts
February 2023 sports events in the United States
2023 in sports in California
Mixed martial arts in California
Sports competitions in California